The following article is a list of cities sorted by homicide rates in the world. The homicide rate of a city is an imprecise tool for comparison, as the population within city borders may not best represent an urban or metropolitan area with varying rates in different areas.

Rankings (2022) 
The following 50 cities have the highest homicide rates in the world of all cities not at war, with a population of at least 300,000 people, and all relevant data available online.

This list reproduces the lists in the two cited sources, and does not incorporate data from other sources.

By country

Other statistics

See also

 Firearm death rates in the United States by state
 Homicide in world cities
 List of Brazilian states by murder rate
 List of countries by firearm-related death rate
 List of countries by intentional death rate - homicide plus suicide.
 List of countries by intentional homicide rate by decade
 List of countries by intentional homicide rate
 List of countries by life expectancy
 List of countries by suicide rate
 List of federal subjects of Russia by murder rate
 List of Mexican states by homicides
 List of U.S. states by homicide rate
 List of United States cities by crime rate (2014). 250,000+
 Number of guns per capita by country
 Right to keep and bear arms in the United States
 United States cities by crime rate (100,000–250,000)
 United States cities by crime rate (60,000-100,000)

Sources

Cities
Cities
Murder rate
Murder rate, Cities